Lucjan Zarzecki (1873–1925) was a Polish pedagogue and mathematician, a co-originator of national education concept. His area of study was general didactics and didactics of mathematics.

Member of the Polska Macierz Szkolna, professor and director of Pedagogics Department of the Wolna Wszechnica Polska in Warsaw.

Notable works
 Charakter jako cel wychowania (1918)
 Nauczanie matematyki początkowej vol. 1–3 (1919–1920)
 Dydaktyka ogólna, czyli kształcenie charakteru przez nauczanie (1920)
 Wstęp do pedagogiki (1922)
 Wychowanie narodowe (1926)

Further reading

References

1873 births
1925 deaths
Mathematics educators
Polish educational theorists
Polish educators
19th-century Polish mathematicians
20th-century Polish mathematicians